The 1993 ABN AMRO World Tennis Tournament was a men's tennis tournament played on indoor carpet courts. It was the 21st edition of the event known that year as the ABN AMRO World Tennis Tournament, and was part of the ATP World Series of the 1993 ATP Tour. It took place at the Rotterdam Ahoy indoor sporting arena in Rotterdam, Netherlands, from 22 February through 28 February 1993. Unseeded Anders Järryd won the singles title.

The singles draw was headlined by ATP No. 7, Wimbledon runner-up, Sydney, Stockholm and recent Doha champion Goran Ivanišević. Other seeded players competing were Los Angeles and Antwerp titlist, Stuttgart Indoor finalist Richard Krajicek, Auckland winner Alexander Volkov, Henrik Holm, Karel Nováček and Wayne Ferreira.

Finals

Singles

 Anders Järryd defeated  Karel Nováček 6–3, 7–5
 It was Anders Järryd's 1st title of the year, and his 8th overall.

Doubles

 Henrik Holm /  Anders Järryd defeated  David Adams /  Andrei Olhovskiy 6–4, 7–6

References

External links
 Official website
 ITF tournament edition details